Leonard Ralph Dickinson (December 19, 1898 – March 13, 1994) was an American businessman and politician.

Dickinson was born in Turtle Lake Township, Beltrami County, Minnesota. He lived in Bemidji, Minnesota with his wife and family and was the owner of Dickinson Lumber Company. Dickinson served in the Minnesota Senate from 1951 to 1954 and in the Minnesota House of Representatives from 1943 to 1950 and from 1961 to 1968. He was a Republican. He died at Beltrami Nursing Home in Bemidji, Minnesota from heart failure. The funeral and burial was in Bemidji, Minnesota.

References

1898 births
1994 deaths
People from Bemidji, Minnesota
Businesspeople from Minnesota
Republican Party Minnesota state senators
Republican Party members of the Minnesota House of Representatives